Enigma is a 1982 Anglo-American thriller film directed by Jeannot Szwarc and starring Martin Sheen, Sam Neill, Brigitte Fossey, and Kevin McNally. Based on Michael Barak's novel Enigma Sacrifice, the film centers on a CIA agent who tries to infiltrate Soviet intelligence in order to stop a murderous plot.

Plot
East German dissident Alex Holbeck (Martin Sheen), living in Paris,  hosts a radio program aimed at Iron Curtain countries. Bodley (Michael Lonsdale), a CIA agent, recruits Alex to take on a dangerous assignment.

Alex is sent to East Berlin on a mission to steal an Enigma code scrambler. This is part of an attempt to stop the Russian assassination of five Soviet dissidents planned for Christmas Day. What Alex does not know is that the CIA already has a code scrambler. By stealing the scrambler in Berlin, they are trying to convince the Russians that they do not have a copy.

On arrival in Berlin, Alex finds that the East German police and KGB knows that he is there. Alex must use numerous disguises and escape from a number of capture attempts. He seeks shelter with his former lover, Karen Reinhardt (Brigitte Fossey), before moving on, as it is too dangerous for her. Karen and a number of Alex's other old friends are arrested and tortured by the police in an attempt to gain information about Alex's whereabouts.

As he gets more desperate, Alex enlists Karen's help again; she seduces Dimitri Vasilikov (Sam Neill), the KGB man in charge of the hunt for Alex, to obtain information. In the end, Dimitri catches Alex and Karen and finds the scrambler hidden in an exhibition artifact. As he is in love with Karen, he lets them go, but keeps the scrambler, which was in fact not needed. On Christmas Day, the assassination attempt is successfully thwarted.

Cast

 Martin Sheen as Alex Holbeck
 Brigitte Fossey as Karen Reinhardt
 Sam Neill as Dimitri Vasilikov
 Derek Jacobi as Kurt Limmer
 Michael Lonsdale as Bodley
 Frank Finlay as Canarsky
 Warren Clarke as Konstantin
 Michael Williams as Hirsch
 David Baxt as Melton
 Kevin McNally as Bruno, CIA
 Michel Auclair as Doctor
 Féodor Atkine as The Diplomat
 Vincent Grass as Soviet W
 Patrick Bauchau as Soviet Soldier
 Liliane Rovère

Production
Goldcrest Films put up $58,000 in development costs and invested £985,000 in the budget of $8.1 million. The company received £355,000, losing £630,000.

Enigma was shot partly, in 1982, at Paris–Le Bourget Airport. A scene was shot in the terminal, in the hall of eight columns, disused at the time, others on the terrace or in front of the entrance.

The aircraft in Enigma are: 
 Dassault Super MystèreB.2 
 Dassault Mystère IVA, F-TENN
 Dassault MD.450 Ouragan, F-TEUU 
 Sud Aviation SE-210 Caravelle, F -BJTR 
 Lockheed L-749 Constellation, F-ZVMV {{#tag:ref|Since 1975, Le Bourget Airport has hosted the Musée de l’air et de l’espace, France's main state-owned aviation museum, and aircraft from the museum were seen in Enigma".|group=N}}

Reception
Janet Maslin in her review for The New York Times, decried the "wise-guy" attitude in Enigma, writing, "There are plenty of mysteries about Enigma but they aren't necessarily the ones the film makers intended. As directed by Jeannot Szwarc, best known for Jaws 2 and Somewhere in Time, this is the spy film at its most absurdly hard-boiled and at its most icily perfunctory. It is punctuated by crisp titles (indicating the date of each scene), played very close to the vest and riddled with false alarms ..."

Film historian and critic Leonard Maltin in Leonard Maltin's Movie Guide 2013 (2012) noted a "fine cast does its best with so-so material."

References
Notes

Citations

Bibliography

 Eberts, Jake and Terry Illott. My Indecision is Final. London: Faber and Faber, 1990. .
 Floyd, Nigel. "Review: 'Enigma'." in Pym, John, ed. Time Out Film Guide. London: Time Out Guides Limited, 2004. .
 Maltin, Leonard. Leonard Maltin's Movie Guide 2013. New York: New American Library, 2012 (originally published as TV Movies, then Leonard Maltin’s Movie & Video Guide''), First edition 1969, published annually since 1988. .

External links

1982 films
Films directed by Jeannot Szwarc
Cold War spy films
1980s thriller drama films
British aviation films
Films scored by Douglas Gamley
Films scored by Marc Wilkinson
Films set in Berlin
Films about the Central Intelligence Agency
American aviation films
1982 drama films
Films with screenplays by John Briley
Films set in Paris
Films set in East Germany
Films about the KGB
Films about assassinations
1980s English-language films
1980s American films
1980s British films